T. P. Balagopalan M. A. is a 1986 Indian Malayalam-language comedy drama film directed by Sathyan Anthikkad and written by Sreenivasan from a story by Anthikkad. Starring Mohanlal in the title role, along with Shobana, Balan K. Nair, Kuthiravattam Pappu, Maniyanpilla Raju, Sreenivasan, Sukumari, and K. P. A. C. Lalitha. The story follows T. P. Balagopalan, who struggles to make ends meet and his romantic life with Anitha.

The film won two Kerala State Film Awards—Best Actor for Mohanlal and Best Story for Anthikkad.

Plot

The film revolves around T. P. Balagopalan, a low-scale employee at Falcon products who is also a kind and caring young man. He owns some land which his elder sister and her husband are trying to grab from him. He falls in love with a school teacher Anitha, whom he meets in one of his marketing trysts for Falcon products.

He loses his land when he tries to help her father in a litigation. He also loses his job due to labor union issues. His younger sister, not being able to get married in a traditional arranged marriage set up, marries his friend Narayanankutty. His elder sister and family leave his house when they find out that he does not have the land anymore.

Meanwhile, Anitha's father wins the court case and becomes rich. He returns Balagopalan's money, but refuses to acknowledge his love with Anitha. He tries to get her married off to the lawyer who appeared for him in High Court and won the case for him. However, Anitha runs away on the day off her wedding to go and live with Balagopalan at his home town. So Balagopalan, Anitha and Balagopalan's grandmother happily start living in his home town as the film ends.

Cast
 Mohanlal as T. P. Balagopalan
 Shobana as Anitha
 Balan K. Nair as Anitha's Father
 Sukumari as Anitha's Mother
 Adoor Bhavani as Balagopalan's Grandmother
 Kuthiravattam Pappu as Chandrankutty, Balagopalan's Brother-In-Law
 K. P. A. C. Lalitha as Balagopalan's Elder Sister
 Sreenivasan as Advocate Ramakrishnan 
 Uma Bharani as Devi 
 Maniyanpilla Raju as Narayankutty
 Kothuku Nanappan 
 Suresh Gopi as Man arranged to wed Devi
 Priyadarshan as in a cameo appearance as a film director

Soundtrack
The music was composed by A. T. Ummer and the lyrics were written by Sathyan Anthikkad.

Awards
Kerala State Film Awards
Best Actor - Mohanlal
Best Story - Sathyan Anthikkad

References

External links
 

1986 films
1980s Malayalam-language films
Films with screenplays by Sreenivasan
Films directed by Sathyan Anthikad
1986 comedy-drama films
1986 comedy films
1986 drama films
Indian comedy-drama films
Films shot in Thiruvananthapuram
Films scored by A. T. Ummer